The Sikorsky S-41 was an amphibious flying boat airliner produced in the United States in the early 1930s. Essentially a scaled-up monoplane version of the Sikorsky S-38 biplane flying boat, Pan Am operated the type on routes in the Caribbean, South America, and between Boston and Halifax.

Development
The S-41 had a parasol wing configuration, with two radial engines mounted on struts between the fuselage and the wing. The cabin was completely enclosed within the all-metal hull and could seat 15 passengers.

The United States Navy purchased three examples and designated them RS-1; these were joined by two Pan Am aircraft pressed into Navy service and designated RS-5.

Variants
S-41A
S-41B
S-41C
RS-1
United States Navy designation for three S-41s for evaluation.
RS-5
Two S-41s impressed into service with the United States Navy.

Operators

 Pan Am
 United States Navy

Accidents and incidents
 On 27 August 1931, A Sikorsky S-41, NC41V of Boston-Maine Airways  crash landed in  while making the run between Halifax (N.S.) and Boston (MA). After clinging to the sides of a partially inflated life raft in rough seas for two hours, the 12 survivors were rescued by the F/V Nova Julia, a mackerel seiner out of Gloucester MA, captained by Capt. Leo Favaloro. There was one fatality. Seventy-year-old Edward Bamwell was assumed trapped in the wreckage as it disappeared beneath the waves just a moment after he gallantly allowed one of the three women passengers to precede him to the waiting raft. The Sikorsky had only been in service one month. Heavy fog was cited as the cause of the crash. The S-41 was repaired and reregistered as NC60V.
 On 28 October 1931, Col Thomas C. Turner, Chief of the Aviation Section of the United States Marine Corps, flew as a passenger in a Sikorsky RS-1 to Port-au-Prince, Haiti. After arrival, the aircraft became stuck in the sand; when he got out to inspect it, he was struck in the head by one of its propellers. He died from his injuries two days later.

Specifications (S-41A)

See also

References

Notes

Bibliography
 
  (payment required to view full article)
 
 
 
 
 
 
 

1930s United States airliners
Flying boats
S-041
Amphibious aircraft
Twin-boom aircraft
Parasol-wing aircraft
Aircraft first flown in 1930
Twin piston-engined tractor aircraft